Ángel Trinidad de Haro (born 27 March 1993) is a Spanish professional volleyball player. He is a member of the Spain national team. At the professional club level, he plays for Berlin Recycling Volleys.

Honours

Clubs
 National championships
 2012/2013  Spanish Championship, with Unicaja Almería
 2015/2016  Belgian Cup, with Knack Roeselare
 2015/2016  Belgian Championship, with Knack Roeselare
 2016/2017  Belgian Cup, with Knack Roeselare
 2016/2017  Belgian Championship, with Knack Roeselare
 2017/2018  Belgian Cup, with Knack Roeselare
 2018/2019  French Cup, with Tours VB
 2018/2019  French Championship, with Tours VB
 2022/2023  German SuperCup, with Berlin Recycling Volleys
 2022/2023  German Cup, with Berlin Recycling Volleys

Youth national team
 2011  FIVB U19 World Championship
 2012  CEV U20 European Championship

References

External links

 
 Player profile at LegaVolley.it 
 Player profile at PlusLiga.pl 
 Player profile at Volleybox.net

1993 births
Living people
People from Estepona
Sportspeople from the Province of Málaga
Spanish men's volleyball players
Mediterranean Games medalists in volleyball
Competitors at the 2018 Mediterranean Games
Mediterranean Games silver medalists for Spain
Spanish expatriate sportspeople in Italy
Expatriate volleyball players in Italy
Spanish expatriate sportspeople in Germany
Expatriate volleyball players in Germany
Spanish expatriate sportspeople in Belgium
Expatriate volleyball players in Belgium
Spanish expatriate sportspeople in France
Expatriate volleyball players in France
Spanish expatriate sportspeople in Poland
Expatriate volleyball players in Poland
Tours Volley-Ball players
Projekt Warsaw players
Setters (volleyball)